TOTE Maritime is an owner/operator of domestic shipping in the United States.  They specialize in moving cargo between North America to Puerto Rico and Alaska.  TOTE Maritime Puerto Rico was the owner of El Faro, a large container ship that sank in 2015 after she steamed directly into a hurricane.

Subsidiaries
The Sea Star Line is a subsidiary of Tote Maritime.

Fleet
Historic

 SS Great Land 1975 - Ponce-Class roll-on/roll-off ship, decommissioned after 2010 and sent to be broken up 2013
 6 Very Large Crude Carriers - operated by Interocean Management Corporation (now Tote Services) from 1975 to 1980
 3 Liberty Class ships - operated by Interocean Management Corporation (now Tote Services) from 1975 to 1980
 SS Westward Venture 1977 - Ponce-Class Ro/RO ship
 SS Northern Lights 1975, renamed 1991 and acquired in 1993; became SS El Faro in 2006 and sank in 2015
 SS El Morro 1974 - sister to El Faro, scrapped in 2012 after a Coast Guard inspection revealed the ship was structurally unsound.
 SS El Yunque 1976 - sister to El Faro, scrapped in 2017 after a Coast Guard inspection revealed the ventilation trunks had rusted away.

Current

List of ships owned by TOTE:

 2 tug and barge set - acquired 1985
 2 tug and barge set - acquired 1990
 MV Midnight Sun 2002 - Orca Class ship (to be converted as LNG 2016)
 MV North Star 2003 - Orca Class ship (to be converted as LNG 2016)

Tote Maritime is notable for ordering the world's first LNG-powered container ships:

  launched on 15 April 2015
  on August 31, 2015.

Sinking of El Faro

The  was lost with all hands after entering the eye wall of Hurricane Joaquin and losing power between Florida and the Bahamas on October 1, 2015. Coast Guard investigators lambasted TOTE Maritime, stating the company made several violations regarding crew members' rest periods and work hours, had no dedicated safety officer to oversee the El Faro, and used outdated, "open air" lifeboats (similar to the types used on older vessels, such as the RMS Titanic) instead of the modern enclosed survival craft, among other violations.  The company never filed an internal incident and investigation record for the sinking.

External links

References
http://shipbuildinghistory.com/shipyards/large/sun.htm

Container shipping companies of the United States
Container shipping companies
American companies established in 1975
Multinational companies based in Jacksonville